Colin Ress (born 28 November 1955) is a French former swimmer. He competed in the men's 4 × 200 metre freestyle relay at the 1976 Summer Olympics.

References

External links
 

1955 births
Living people
French male freestyle swimmers
Olympic swimmers of France
Swimmers at the 1976 Summer Olympics
Place of birth missing (living people)